Åmli is a municipality in Agder county, Norway. It is located in the traditional region of Sørlandet. The main population centre and administrative center is the village of Åmli which lies along the river Nidelva. Other villages in Åmli include Askland, Dølemo, Eppeland, Flaten, Hillestad, Homdrom, Lauveik, Nelaug, Øvre Ramse, Skjeggedal, Tveit, Vehus, and Ytre Ramse.

The  municipality is the 98th largest by area out of the 356 municipalities in Norway. Åmli is the 292nd most populous municipality in Norway with a population of 1,801.

General information

Name
The municipality (originally the prestegjeld) is named after the old Åmli farm, since the first Åmli Church was built there. The first element is almr which means "elm" and the last element is líð which means "hillside". The name was historically spelled Omlid and Aamli.

Coat of arms
The coat of arms was granted on 23 October 1987. The official blazon is "Azure a beaver rampant regardant argent". This means the arms have a blue field (background) and the charge is a beaver. The beaver has a tincture of argent which means it is commonly colored white or gray, but if it is made out of metal, then silver is used. The beaver was chosen because the Åmli area was one of the few remaining beaver habitats in Europe. By the late 19th century, only about 100 beavers were left in Europe, mostly in the Åmli area. They were protected and after World War I, the beavers from this area have been used to help re-populate other areas in Europe where the beaver had gone extinct in the wild. The arms were designed by Odd Einar Ufsvatn who won a competition for designing the arms.

Churches
The Church of Norway has two parishes within the municipality of Åmli. It is part of the Aust-Nedenes prosti (deanery) in the Diocese of Agder og Telemark.

History
The parish of Omlid was established as a municipality on 1 January 1838 (see formannskapsdistrikt law). In 1876, the southwestern district of Åmli (population: 663) was separated from it to become the municipality of Mykland. This left Åmli with 2,564 inhabitants. On 1 January 1908, Åmli was split into three municipalities: the northern area surrounding the river Gjøv (pop: 590) became the municipality of Gjevedal, the southwestern area surrounding the Tovdalselva river (pop: 389) became Lille Topdal, and the remainder of the old municipality (population: 2,024) continued as Åmli municipality.

During the 1960s, there were many municipal mergers across Norway due to the work of the Schei Committee. On 1 January 1960, the neighboring municipality of Gjøvdal (pop: 362) was merged with Åmli to form a new, larger municipality called Åmli. The combined population was 2,309. On 1 January 1962, the Espestølsgrenda area (pop: 7) was transferred from Åmli (and Aust-Agder county) to neighboring Nissedal municipality (in Telemark county). Several uninhabited areas (the Espestøl, Reinefoss, and Espestølstykket farms) were transferred to Nissedal municipality in Telemark county on 1 January 1965. Then on 1 January 1967, the neighboring municipality of Tovdal (pop: 161) was merged back into the municipality of Åmli. Åmli then had a total of 2,211 inhabitants. On 1 January 1968, the Flateland farm (pop: 6) was transferred to the municipality of Froland.

Geography

Åmli is located in northern Agder county. It is bordered on the north by Fyresdal and Nissedal municipalities (in Vestfold og Telemark county), on the east by Vegårshei municipality, on the south by Froland municipality, and on the west by Bygland municipality.

The most densely populated area is around the municipal center of Åmli, which lies on the banks of the river Nidelva. The village has about 682 residents (in 2017). Side valleys which join the main valley include Gjøvdal and Tovdal. The rivers Nidelva and Tovdalselva flow through the valleys.

In the southern part of the municipality the Sørlandsbanen railway line passes through the area, stopping at the Nelaug Station. The largest villages in Åmli include Dølemo, Nelaug, Hillestad, and Askland. The rest of the population is scattered among the valleys.

At , the highest point is Trongedalsfjell, which lies between the Tovdal and Gjøvdal valleys. Several lakes are located in Åmli including Måvatn, Nasvatn, and Nelaug.

Climate
The all-time high is  set 10 August 1975, a month with 8 days above . The warmest month on record is July 2018 with mean . The all-time low is   recorded 10 February 1966.

Government
All municipalities in Norway, including Åmli, are responsible for primary education (through 10th grade), outpatient health services, senior citizen services, unemployment and other social services, zoning, economic development, and municipal roads. The municipality is governed by a municipal council of elected representatives, which in turn elect a mayor.  The municipality falls under the Agder District Court and the Agder Court of Appeal.

Municipal council
The municipal council of Åmli is made up of 17 representatives that are elected to four year terms. Currently, the party breakdown is as follows:

Economy
Lumbering in Åmli provides for about 12% of the old Aust-Agder county's total timber production making it the third most import source of timber in Aust-Adger (after Froland and Birkenes). Agriculture, including sheep husbandry, provides a minor contribution to the economy. 
 
Electrical power is generated by a hydroelectric plant at Flatefoss, which regulates the level of the lake, Nelaug.

The newspaper Åmliavisa has been published in Åmli since 2008.

Transportation
The main road through Åmli is the north–south Norwegian National Road 41. Other roads include Norwegian County Road 412, Norwegian County Road 413, and Norwegian County Road 415. There are also two railway lines running through southern Åmli:  the main Sørlandsbanen railway line which stops at Nelaug Station and the branch line Arendalsbanen which terminates at Nelaug Station, but also stops at Flaten Station.

Notable residents
 Engvald Bakkan (1897 in Åmli – 1982) a Norwegian pharmacist, novelist and children's writer
 Olav Kjetilson Nylund (1903 in Åmli – 1957) a Norwegian politician, Mayor of Åmli 1934-1940
 Gunnar Halvorsen (1945–2006) a Norwegian politician, Mayor of Åmli 1979–1983
 Jonas Alaska (born 1988), a musician

References

External links

Municipal fact sheet from Statistics Norway 

Culture in Åmli on the map

 
Municipalities of Agder
1838 establishments in Norway